Oswald is a masculine given name, from Anglo-Saxon Osƿeald, from os "god" and ƿeald "rule".  The Old High German cognate was Answald, the Old Norse form was Ásvaldr.

Oswald of Northumbria (c. 604–641/2) was a king of Northumbria and is venerated as saint. The name fell out of use in the later medieval period, although it appears to have been rarely given in reference to the saint even in the late 14th century, as evidenced by the name of German poet and diplomat Oswald von Wolkenstein (1376/7–1445). The name was revived in the 19th century, but it was never frequently given. 
Its popularity in the United States peaked in 1886 at rank 451, and it fell below rank 1,000 in the mid-1930s.
By contrast, the Hispanic form Osvaldo became popular in the United States by the 1970s, peaking at rank 410 in 2004.

People with the given name include:

Oswald of Worcester (died 992), Archbishop of York and saint
Oswald de Andrade (1890–1954), Brazilian writer and poet
Oswald Avery (1877–1955), Canadian-American physician, medical researcher and molecular biologist
Oswald Achenbach (1827–1905), German landscape painter
Oswald Balzer (1858–1933), Polish historian
Oswald Berkhan (1834–1917), German physician 
Oswald Boelcke (1891–1916), German flying ace of the First World War
Oswald Chambers (1874–1917), Scottish Protestant Christian minister and teacher
Oswald Leslie De Kretser II (1882–1959), Puisne Justice of Supreme Court of Sri Lanka
Oswald Garrison Villard (1872–1949), American journalist
Oswald Gomis (1932-2023), 10th Archbishop of Colombo
Oswald Gracias (born 1944), Goan Catholic clergyman, Archbishop of Bombay
Oswald Heer (1809–1883), Swiss geologist and naturalist
Oswald H. Johnson (1912–1993), American politician
Oswald Karch (1917–2009), German Formula One driver
Oswald Lohse (1845–1915), German astronomer
Ossie Mazengarb (1890–1963), New Zealand magistrate with a full name of Oswald Chettle Mazengarb
Oswald Mosley (1896–1980), English fascist and politician, founder of the British Union of Fascists
Oswald Myconius (1488–1552), Swiss theologian and follower of Huldrych Zwingli
Oswald Pohl (1892–1951), German Nazi SS officer executed for war crimes
Oswald Spengler (1880–1936), German historian and philosopher
Oswald Stoll (1866–1942), Australian-British theater manager
Oswald Szemerényi (1913–1996), Hungarian linguist
Oswald Teichmüller (1913–1943), German mathematician
Oswald Tschirtner (1920–2007), Austrian artist
Oswald Veblen (1880–1960), American mathematician
Oswald von Wolkenstein (1376/7–1445), a composer
Oswald West (1873–1960), American politician, 14th Governor of Oregon
Oswald Wirth ( (1860–1943), Swiss occultist

See also
Oswaldo (Spanish Oswalds)
Oswald (surname)
Oswald (disambiguation)
Ansaldo (name)

References

English-language masculine given names
German masculine given names
English masculine given names
Old English given names
Theophoric names